James Blessington (28 February 1874 – 18 April 1939) was a Scottish football player (an inside right) and manager.

Playing career

Club
Born in Linlithgow, West Lothian, Blessington began his playing career with several Edinburgh sides, including Hibernian (then temporarily known as Leith Hibernians) and Leith Athletic, before moving to Glasgow to join Celtic in 1892. He spent six seasons at Celtic Park, earning three Scottish Football League titles (1892–93, 1893–94 and 1895–96).

He moved to England in 1898, spending short periods with Preston North End, Derby County, Bristol City followed by three years at Luton Town and his longest spell at Leicester Fosse between 1903 and 1909.

International
Blessington was capped four times by the Scottish national team between 1894 and 1896 during his time with Celtic. He also made six appearances for the Scottish League representative side, scoring one goal.

Managerial career and later life
Between 1907 and 1909 Blessington acted as player-manager of Leicester Fosse (though he played only very occasionally), becoming that club's first manager, and was in charge for a total of 84 games.

He then moved to Ireland, where he helped coach Belfast Celtic and also assisted the Irish Amateur Athletic Association as a handicapper. He later moved to Newton Abbot in Devon, where he ran a pub.

References

1874 births
1939 deaths
Scottish footballers
Scotland international footballers
Hibernian F.C. players
Celtic F.C. players
Preston North End F.C. players
Derby County F.C. players
Bristol City F.C. players
Luton Town F.C. players
Leicester City F.C. players
Scottish football managers
Leicester City F.C. managers
People from Linlithgow
English Football League managers
English Football League players
Southern Football League players
Scottish Football League players
Scottish Football League representative players
Leith Athletic F.C. players
Footballers from West Lothian
Association football inside forwards
Association football player-managers
British Merchant Service personnel of World War I
Association football coaches
Publicans